Coleophora implicitella is a moth of the family Coleophoridae. It is found in Armenia.

References

implicitella
Moths described in 1903
Moths of Asia